Gymnopilus bryophilus is a species of mushroom in the family Hymenogastraceae.

Description

Habitat and distribution
Gymnopilus bryophilus has been found growing on decayed mossy logs, in Jamaica in November.

See also

List of Gymnopilus species

References

External links
Index Fungorum

bryophilus
Fungi of North America
Taxa named by William Alphonso Murrill